Neochthebius is a genus of minute moss beetles in the family Hydraenidae. There are at least two described species in Neochthebius.

Species
These two species belong to the genus Neochthebius:
 Neochthebius granulosus (Satô, 1963)
 Neochthebius vandykei (Knisch, 1924)

References

Further reading

 

Staphylinoidea
Articles created by Qbugbot